is a Japanese philosopher and literary critic.

Biography

Karatani entered the University of Tokyo in 1960, where he joined the radical Marxist Communist League, better known as "The Bund," and participated in the massive 1960 Anpo protests against the U.S.-Japan Security Treaty, which he would later come to view as a formative political experience.

Karatani graduated with a B.A. in economics in 1965, and added an M.A. in English literature in 1967. The Gunzō Literary Prize, which he received at the age of 27 for an essay on Natsume Sōseki, was his first critical acclaim as a literary critic. While teaching at Hosei University, Tokyo, he wrote extensively about modernity and postmodernity with a particular focus on language, number, and money, concepts that form the subtitle of one of his central books: Architecture as Metaphor.

In 1975, he was invited to Yale University to teach Japanese literature as a visiting professor, where he met Paul de Man and Fredric Jameson and began to work on formalism. He started from a study of Natsume Sōseki.

Karatani collaborated with novelist Kenji Nakagami, to whom he introduced the works of Faulkner. With Nakagami, he published  Kobayashi Hideo o koete (Overcoming Kobayashi Hideo). The title is an ironic reference to “Kindai no chokoku” (Overcoming Modernity), a symposium held in the summer of 1942 at Kyoto Imperial University (now Kyoto University) at which Hideo Kobayashi (whom Karatani and Nakagami did not hold in great esteem) was a participant.

He was also a regular member of ANY, the international architects' conference that was held annually for the last decade of the 20th century and that also published an architectural/philosophical series with Rizzoli under the general heading of Anyone.

Since 1990, Karatani has been regularly teaching at Columbia University as a visiting professor.

Karatani founded the New Associationist Movement (NAM) in Japan in the summer of 2000. NAM was conceived as a counter–capitalist/nation-state association, inspired by the experiment of LETS (Local Exchange Trading Systems, based on non-marketed currency). He was also the co-editor, with Akira Asada, of the Japanese quarterly journal Hihyōkūkan (Critical Space), until it ended in 2002.

In 2006, Karatani retired from the chair of the International Center for Human Sciences at Kinki University, Osaka, where he had been teaching.

In 2022, Karatani was awarded the $1 million Berggruen Prize for Culture and Philosophy.

Philosophy 
Karatani has produced philosophical concepts, such as "the will to architecture", which he calls the foundation of all Western thinking, but the best-known of them is probably that of "Transcritique", which he proposed in his book Transcritique, where he reads Kant through Marx and vice versa. Writing about Transcritique in the New Left Review of January–February 2004, Slavoj Žižek brought Karatani's work to greater critical attention. Žižek borrowed the concept of "parallax view" (which is also the title of his review) for the title of his own book.

Karatani has interrogated the possibility of a (de Manian) deconstruction and engaged in a dialogue with Jacques Derrida at the Second International Conference on Humanistic Discourse, organized by the Université de Montréal. Derrida commented on Karatani's paper "Nationalism and Ecriture" with an emphasis on the interpretation of his own concept of écriture.

Bibliography 
In English
 Origins of Modern Japanese Literature, Duke University Press, 1993. Translated by Brett de Bary
 Architecture as Metaphor; Language, Number, Money MIT Press, 1995. Translated by Sabu Kohso
 Transcritique: On Kant and Marx, MIT Press, 2003. Translated by Sabu Kohso
 History and Repetition, Columbia University Press, 2011. Translated by Seiji M. Lippit
 The Structure of World History : From Modes of Production to Modes of Exchange, Duke University Press, 2014. Translated by Michael K. Bourdaghs
 Nation and Aesthetics: On Kant and Freud, Oxford University Press USA, 2017. Translated by Jonathan E. Abel, Hiroki Yoshikuni and Darwin H. Tsen
 Isonomia and the Origins of Philosophy, Duke University Press, 2017. Translated by Joseph A. Murphy
 Marx: Towards the Centre of Possibility, Verso, 2020. Edited, translated, and with an introduction by Gavin Walker

In Japanese
 畏怖する人間 [Human in Awe], Tōjūsha, 1972
 意味という病 [Meaning as Illness], Kawadeshobō, 1975
 マルクスその可能性の中心 [Marx: The Center of Possibilities], Kōdansha, 1978
 日本近代文学の起源 [Origins of Modern Japanese literature], Kōdansha, 1980
 隠喩としての建築 [Architecture as Metaphor], Kōdansha, 1983
 内省と遡行 [Introspection and Retrospection], Kōdansha,1984
 批評とポストモダン[Postmodernism and Criticism], Fukutake, 1985
 探究 1 [Philosophical Inquiry 1], Kōdansha, 1986
 言葉と悲劇[Language and Tragedy], Daisanbunmeisha, 1989
 探究 2 [Philosophical Inquiry 2], Kōdansha,1989
 終焉をめぐって[On the 'End' ], Fukutake, 1990
 漱石論集成 [Collected Essays on Sōseki], Daisanbunmeisha, 1992
 ヒューモアとしての唯物論 [Materialism as Humor], Chikumashobō, 1993
 “戦前”の思考 [Thoughts before the war], Bungeishunjusha, 1994
 坂口安吾と中上健次[Sakaguchi Ango and Nakagami Kenji], Ohta Press, 1996
 倫理21[Ethics 21], Heibonsha, 2000
 可能なるコミュニズム[A Possible Communism], Ohta Press, 2000
 トランスクリティーク：カントとマルクス[Transcritique: On Kant and Marx], Hihyōkūkansha, 2001
 日本精神分析[Psychoanalysis of Japan or Analysis of Japanese Spirit], Bungeishunjusha, 2002
 ネーションと美学 [Nation and Aesthetics], Iwanami Shoten, 2004
 歴史と反復[History and Repetition], Iwanami Shoten, 2004
 近代文学の終わり[The End of Modern Literature], Inscript, 2005
 思想はいかに可能か[How the ideas can be created], Inscript, 2005
 世界共和国へ[Toward the World Republic], Iwanami Shoten, 2006
 日本精神分析[Psychoanalyzation on Japan and/or Japanese Spirit], Kōdansha, 2007
 柄谷行人　政治を語る[Talks on politics], Tosyo Shinbun, 2009
 世界史の構造[The Structure of World History], Iwanami Shoten, 2010
 "世界史の構造"を読む[Reading "The Structure of World History"], Inscript, 2011
 政治と思想 1960-2011[Politics and Thought:1960-2011], Heibonsha, 2012
 脱原発とデモ[Denuclearization and Demonstration], Chikuma Shobo, 2012
 哲学の起源[The Origin of Philosophy], Iwanami Shoten, 2012
 柳田國男論[On Kunio Yanagita], Inscript, 2013
 遊動論：柳田国男と山人[On Nomadization : Kunio Yanagita and Yamabito people], Bungeishunjusha, 2014
 帝国の構造[The Structure of Empire], Seitosha, 2014
 定本 柄谷行人 文学論集[Symposium on Literature], Iwanami Shoten, 2016
 憲法の無意識[Unconsciousness of the Constitution of Japan], Iwanami Shoten, 2016
 力と交換様式[Power and Modes of Exchange], Iwanami Shoten, October 5th, 2022

See also
Fredric Jameson
Arata Isozaki
List of deconstructionists

Notes

External links
Official website
"Japan as Museum" by Karatani about Okakura Kakuzo.

1941 births
20th-century Japanese philosophers
21st-century philosophers
Columbia University faculty
Continental philosophers
Critical theorists
Deconstruction
Japanese literary critics
Japanese Marxists
Living people
Marxist theorists
Marxist writers
People from Amagasaki
Philosophers of art
Philosophers of culture
Philosophers of history
Philosophers of literature
Political philosophers
Japanese social commentators
Social philosophers
University of Tokyo alumni
Yale University faculty